Toosa is a village in Punjab, India.  It is located in the Ludhiana district, on the Ludhiana Jodhan Raikot road about 23 km south of Ludhiana, near Sudhar.

Village structure
The village is divided into 3 parts which developed based on its growth:
Older Village inside redline (inside the Darwazas)
Andarli Firni (1st Firni, inner ring)
Bahrli Firni (2nd Firni, outer ring)
Halwara Road Extension
Rattowal Road Extension
Leel Road Extension

Before 1950, all villagers lived within the redline area between two Darwazas (known as Vadda Darwaza and Shera Vala Darwaza). The houses are small traditional Punjabi houses.

After 1950, people started moving toward outside the redline.  The 1st Firni was drawn in a ring shape outside the redline area for use as a common road.  Houses were built in this area until circa 1980, at which time the village needed another Firni because of lack of space. Housing continued to be built in this outer ring area.

In the present, people are moving toward the outer roads of Toosa, which connect to nearby villages.
check out the blog of the village here.

Demographics
The population is above 17,000 and the area is 4,117 hectares according to the 2001 census.

Neighbouring villages
Rattowal to the north 1.5 km
Sarabha to the north-east 4.8 km
Leel to the south-east 2.3 km
Halwara in south-west 2.5 km
Near to Sudhar. Village is connected to Gurusar Sudhar and Pakhowal with wide & freshly built road. Ludhiana International Airport Halwara is about 2 km from village centre.

Toosa village has following facilities for Public betterment  

 Aanganwari ( Play School )
 Government Primary School Toosa
 Khalsa Senior Secondary School Toosa
 Government Dispensary for Humans
 Government Veterinary Dispensary 
 Public Water Works
 Post Office
 Panchyat Ghar
 Play Ground near Dera Sant Aatma Singh Ji
 Play Ground near Khalsa Senior Secondary School

Worship Places 
Toosa village is multicultural village , peoples follow Sikhism, Sanatan Dharma etc . Village has 3 Gurdwaras , 2 Baba Bhuanas , 3 Mandirs , Baba Saheeds , Dera Sant Aatma Singh Ji. 

Villages in Ludhiana district